St. John Paul II Catholic High School is a private, coeducational, Catholic high school in Tallahassee, Florida. It is a diocesan school of the Roman Catholic Diocese of Pensacola-Tallahassee and accredited by the Southern Association of Colleges and Schools.

SJPII, the first Catholic high school to be founded in Tallahassee, opened in 2001. It graduated its first class in 2004, with the first charter class graduating the next year, in 2005.

The St. John Paul II campus initially had a gymnasium, chapel, main building, soccer field, and baseball field. A softball field was added in 2013 and opened for the 2014 season. The school has plans for future expansion.

Academics
The school teaches several Advanced Placement Courses including:

AP Art
AP Biology
AP Calculus
AP Chemistry
AP Language & Composition
AP Literature
AP Spanish

There are also on-site Dual Enrollment Course with Tallahassee Community College.

Activities

The school also has a wide range of clubs, among them an Automotive Club, Aerospace Engineering club, and Literary club.

SJPII has an active drama department, a chorus that competes statewide in choral competitions, a musical instrument program, and a creative arts department that has competed in art competitions and exhibited at various Tallahassee museums and shows. St. John Paul II puts on an annual arts and music festival known as SouthWoodStock featuring student and outside artists and musicians.

Athletics
St. John Paul II High School's mascot is Pep the Panther, and their colors are Blue and Gold. SJPII has eight boys' athletic teams and nine girls' teams.

Boys' Sports
Basketball (2019 Class 3-A Boys Basketball State Championship) 
Baseball
Cross Country
Football
Golf
Soccer
Tennis
Track

Girls' Sports
Basketball
Softball
Cross Country
Golf
Soccer
Tennis
Volleyball
Track
Cheerleading

St. John Paul II School hosts the District volleyball, basketball and baseball events.

Notes and references

External links
 St. John Paul II Catholic High School

Catholic secondary schools in Florida
Schools in Tallahassee, Florida
Educational institutions established in 2001
High schools in Leon County, Florida
Roman Catholic Diocese of Pensacola–Tallahassee
2001 establishments in Florida